The Clarke Range, part of the Great Dividing Range, is a rainforest-covered mountain range located in North Queensland, Australia.

The range is composed of granite rocks. The slopes of Clarke Range form the upper reaches of the Pioneer River valley. Broken River also rises in the range, flowing west to join the Burdekin River.

An exploration party led by John Mackay were the first Europeans to cross the range on 18 May 1860.

The main road over the range winds sharply and steeply and is not suitable for caravans.

Birds
Some  of the Clarke Range, encompassing the Eungella National Park, has been classified as an Important Bird Area by BirdLife International because it supports most of the population of the Eungella honeyeater, an isolated northern population of the regent bowerbird, and large numbers of bush stone-curlews.

See also

List of mountains in Queensland

References

Important Bird Areas of Queensland
North Queensland
Great Dividing Range